A Woman Like Me may refer to:

 A Woman Like Me (album), a 2003 album by Bettye LaVette, and the title track
 A Woman Like Me (film), a 2014 documentary
 "A Woman Like Me" (song), a 2006 song by Beyoncé

See also
 "Woman Like Me", a 2018 song by Little Mix featuring Nicki Minaj